Diasemiopsis is a genus of moths of the family Crambidae.

Species
Diasemiopsis leodocusalis (Walker, 1859)
Diasemiopsis ramburialis (Duponchel, 1833)

References

Spilomelinae
Crambidae genera
Taxa named by Eugene G. Munroe